Saut may refer to:

Historical name of Asyut, capital of the modern Asyut Governorate in Egypt
Saut d'Eau, French for "Waterfall", a small island in the Republic of Trinidad and Tobago
Po Saut (?–1693), king of Panduranga Champa from 1660 to 1692
Regina Vázquez Saut (born 1981), Mexican politician
Judith Vázquez Saut (born 1977), Mexican politician

See also
Saut., taxonomic author abbreviation for Anton Eleutherius Sauter (1800–1881), Austrian physician and botanist